John Glassford (born 20 July 1946) is a former English cricketer.  Glassford was a right-handed batsman who bowled right-arm fast-medium.  He was born in Sunderland, County Durham.

Glassford made his debut for Durham in the 1968 Minor Counties Championship against the Warwickshire Second XI.  In 1969, he played two first-class matches for Warwickshire against Cambridge University and Scotland.  In these two matches, he took a total of 5 wickets at an average of 32.20, with best figures of 2/9.  He continued to play for Durham on an infrequent basis over the following seasons, making seven further Minor Counties Championship appearances, the last of which came against Shropshire in 1974.

References

External links
John Glassford at ESPNcricinfo
John Glassford at CricketArchive

1946 births
Living people
Cricketers from Sunderland
English cricketers
Durham cricketers
Warwickshire cricketers